Laura van Imhoff is a Dutch curler and curling coach.

At the international level, she competed as the skip of the national women's team at two  and nine  championships.

Teams

Record as a coach of national teams

References

External links

Living people
Dutch female curlers
Dutch curling coaches
Year of birth missing (living people)
Place of birth missing (living people)